lishtar Rural District is a rural district (dehestan) in the Central District of Gachsaran County, Kohgiluyeh and Boyer-Ahmad Province, Iran. At the 2006 census, its population was 8,241, in 1,735 families. The rural district has 36 villages. The center of Lishtar is the village of Ali Abad-e Lishtar(Arabs).

References 

Rural Districts of Kohgiluyeh and Boyer-Ahmad Province
Gachsaran County